Hiram George Runnels (December 15, 1796 — December 17, 1857) was a U.S. politician from the states of Mississippi and Texas.

He was a Democrat who served as the ninth governor of Mississippi from November 20, 1833, to December 3, 1835.

Biography 
Runnels was born in Hancock County, Georgia, on December 15, 1796, to Harmon M. and Hester (Hubert) Runnels. A poor frontier family, the Runnels relocated to Mississippi when Hiram was a child. The Runnels were the first white people to build a house in what would become Monticello, Mississippi. He married Obedience Smith in 1823.

Although he received a limited education, Runnels worked as a schoolteacher before serving as the state's auditor and treasurer from 1822 to 1830. Runnels also served as a volunteer in the army during various conflicts with Native Americans. He was elected in the Mississippi House of Representatives in 1830. After an unsuccessful run for governor in 1831, Runnels was elected in May 1833 by only 558 votes. Due to the closeness of the result, he did not take office until the following November.

During his tenure as governor, Runnels secured funding for a new statehouse in Jackson, restructured the state militia, signed a ban on the importation of enslaved people for auction and oversaw the formation of sixteen new counties in the land seized from the Chickasaw Indians. A devoted Jacksonian Democrat, Runnels angered his political allies when he refused to order the state militia to support and arm vigilantes who killed and maimed dozens of white and black people suspected of inciting a slave rebellion during the summer of 1835. On the other hand, more conservative voters and Whigs accused Runnels of verbally condoning vigilantism and preventing the militia and local law enforcement officials from suppressing extralegal violence. Facing criticism from Whigs and many Democrats over the affair, Runnels narrowly lost his reelection bid and left office in November 1835.

In 1838, Runnels was appointed president of the newly chartered Union Bank in Jackson, placing him in deeper conflict with other Democrats. When Union Bank collapsed in 1840, the new governor of Mississippi, Alexander McNutt, accused Runnels and others of corruption. Runnels responded by canning the governor in the streets of Jackson. Debates related to the state's central banking system also led to a duel between Runnels and Volney E. Howard, a director at Union Bank, that same year. Despite these conflicts, Runnels was reelected to represent Hinds County in the state legislature in 1841.

Runnels moved to Texas in 1842 and purchased a cotton plantation located on the Brazos River near Houston. He represented Brazoria County during the Convention of 1845. He was elected to the Texas State Senate in 1855 but failed to qualify for office. He was elected to the Senate again in 1857 but died before taking office. The Texas Senate passed a memorial resolution in his honor, and Benjamin F. Tankersly was sworn into office in his stead.

Runnels died in Houston on December 17, 1857, and was buried in Glenwood Cemetery.

Personality 
The son of a man who "would fire up and fight anybody and at any time," Runnels's personality reflected the rough-hewn violence of his frontier upbringing. Describes as excitable and volatile, his narrow defeat in the 1835 Mississippi gubernatorial race was partially attributed to an emotional outburst against one of his opponents during which he used some very harsh and unparliamentary language.

Legacy 

Runnels County, Texas, was named in his honor.

Runnels was the uncle of Texas Governor Hardin Richard Runnels, and William R. Baker, a Texas State Senator was married to Runnels's niece, Hester.

References

External links
 

1796 births
1857 deaths
Burials at Glenwood Cemetery (Houston, Texas)
Governors of Mississippi
Baptists from Mississippi
American planters
People from Hancock County, Georgia
Mississippi Democrats
Democratic Party governors of Mississippi
Members of the Mississippi House of Representatives
State Auditors of Mississippi
19th-century American politicians
People from Hinds County, Mississippi
19th-century Baptists